Clarence Lyle Barber  (May 5, 1917 – February 27, 2004) was a Canadian economist and academic.

Born in Wolseley, Saskatchewan, he received a B.A. in economics from the University of Saskatchewan in 1939. He won a scholarship to Clark University where he obtained his M.A. in 1941 and he received a Ph.D. in 1952 from the University of Minnesota.

He taught economics at the University of Manitoba from 1949 to 1982 and served as head of the department from 1963 to 1972. Barber also taught at McMaster University, Queen's University, McGill University, and the University of Victoria. His professional interests included macroeconomic theory, international economics, and monetary theory. Barber's best known theoretical contribution was his formulation of the concept of the effective rate of protection. He spent the year 1959-60 living in Manila, Philippines as an advisor working for the United Nations providing assistance to the 1960 Census.

Effects of the Great Depression in his youth motivated Barber to study economics . In 1978, Barber wrote "On the Causes of the Great Depression" where he made a link between demographics and economics. He cited how demand for housing in the U.S. began to drop beginning in 1926. Early in 1929, demand for housing dropped precipitously. The stock market crash in October of that same year was preceded by a decline in demand, Barber argues, that began with a lower formation of households concomitant with lower rates of marriage. After World War I, a birth dearth had resulted; a dearth that demographers have shown did not end until World War II ended. (see Causes of the Great Depression)
The death of young men as soldiers in World War I, coupled with the Flu Pandemic of 1918 wrought their eventual harm to the economy as a whole. The increase in secularization during the 'Roaring Twenties', as automobiles became widespread, and availability of electricity and electrical appliances and such, may have had its effect too. Barber showed in "On Causes..." that lower demand for mortgages and other loans preceded by some years a shortage of loan availability as the Great Depression deepened towards 1933.

After the Winnipeg flood of 1950, he was economic adviser and director of research for the Manitoba Royal Commission Flood Cost-Benefit from 1957 to 1959. The result of which led to the construction of the Red River Floodway.  In 1987, he was made an Officer of the Order of Canada. In 2001, he was awarded the Order of Manitoba.

In 1947, he married Barbara Anne Patchet. They had four children: Paul, Stephen, David, and Alan.

From 1982 to 1985 Clarence served on the Royal Commission on Economic Union and Development Prospects For Canada, more commonly known as the Macdonald Commission. It was on this commission where he argued for free trade with the United States.

References

External links
 Memorable Manitobans: Clarence Lyle Barber (1917-2004)

1917 births
2004 deaths
Canadian economists
Fellows of the Royal Society of Canada
Officers of the Order of Canada
Members of the Order of Manitoba
Clark University alumni
University of Minnesota alumni
Academic staff of the University of Manitoba
University of Saskatchewan alumni
People from Wolseley, Saskatchewan
Canadian expatriates in the United States